The 2023 season is Selangor's 18th season in the Super League  and their 38th consecutive season in the top flight of Malaysia football. The club also participates in the Malaysia Cup and will also participate in the FA Cup.

Review

For 2023 season, Malaysian Football League (MFL) announced the new season will restructuring with 18 teams (instead of 12 previously) in the league matches. However, with the withdrawal of several clubs from the Malaysian League, the MFL confirmed that only 14 teams will play in the league this season. Also, The MFL confirmed that each team is allowed to take 9 import players. Although the MFL will follow the AFC regulations in the use of 6 import players, the MFL still remains by allow only five import players to be fielded, which is three plus one Asian player and one ASEAN player, at any one time while only one import player can be on the bench. 

With under new coach Tan Cheng Hoe who takes a charge for the club last season, Selangor maintain and released several players for a preparation a new campaign for 2023 season. Selangor also made several changes of coaching staff, with bring a new second Assistant Head Coach who has managed a team in the Malaysian Football scene and has extensive experience in Europe, Ramón Marcote. Marcote previously worked with Tan Cheng Hoe, as a Fitness Coach at Kedah in 2015. At the same time, Selangor has also brought in another new face to the Red Giants the coaching line up, Fouzi Mukhlas, who will be this season as a Goalkeeper Coach.

Pre-season and friendlies

2023 Harapan Cup (1–4 February)

Squad information

First-team squad

Reserve Team Squad (call-up)

Transfers

First Transfers

Transfers in

Transfer out 
 

Loan out

Competitions

Overall

Overview

Super League

Table

Results summary

Results by round

Fixtures and Results

Super League

Results overview

FA Cup

Malaysia Cup

Statistics

Squad statistics
 

Appearances (Apps.) numbers are for appearances in competitive games only including sub appearances.
Red card numbers denote: Numbers in parentheses represent red cards overturned for wrongful dismissal.

† Player left the club during the season.

Goalscorers
Includes all competitive matches.

Top assists

Clean sheets

Disciplinary record

 

† Player left the club during the season.

Notes

References

Selangor FA
Selangor